Vaskjõgi Nature Reserve is a nature reserve which is located in Pärnu County, Estonia.

The area of the nature reserve is 291 ha.

The protected area was founded in 2007 to protect valuable habitat types and threatened species in Seljametsa and Vaskrääma village (both in former Paikuse Parish).

References

Nature reserves in Estonia
Geography of Pärnu County